Greenwood, Texas may refer to:

Greenwood, Midland County, Texas 
Greenwood, Wise County, Texas 
Greenwood, Hopkins County, Texas
Greenwood, Red River County, Texas
Greenwood, Parker County, Texas
Greenwood, Van Zandt County, Texas